Apodrassodes is a genus of ground spiders that was first described by J. Vellard in 1924.

Species
 it contains ten species:
Apodrassodes araucanius (Chamberlin, 1916) – Peru, Bolivia, Argentina, Chile
Apodrassodes chula Brescovit & Lise, 1993 – Brazil
Apodrassodes guatemalensis (F. O. Pickard-Cambridge, 1899) (type) – Mexico, Central, South America
Apodrassodes mercedes Platnick & Shadab, 1983 – Chile
Apodrassodes mono Müller, 1987 – Brazil
Apodrassodes pucon Platnick & Shadab, 1983 – Chile
Apodrassodes quilpuensis (Simon, 1902) – Chile
Apodrassodes taim Brescovit & Lise, 1993 – Brazil
Apodrassodes trancas Platnick & Shadab, 1983 – Chile, Argentina
Apodrassodes yogeshi Gajbe, 1993 – India

References

Araneomorphae genera
Gnaphosidae
Spiders of Central America
Spiders of the Indian subcontinent
Spiders of Mexico
Spiders of South America